SHR can refer to:
The IATA code for Sheridan County Airport
Logical shift right operator in some programming languages
Logical shift right in x86 instruction listings
Self-healing ring
SHR (operating system) for smartphones
Scottish Housing Regulator
Shrewsbury railway station station code
Spontaneously hypertensive rat, a laboratory rat
Stewart-Haas Racing, US car racing team
Supplementary Homicide Reports, a US database